Dabikinė Manor is a former Zubov residential manor in Dabikinė, Akmenė District Municipality.

References

Manor houses in Lithuania